Xenotilapia burtoni is a species of cichlid endemic to Lake Tanganyika where it is only known from areas with sandy substrates in Burton Bay.  This species can reach a length of  TL.  It can also be found in the aquarium trade.

References

burtoni
Fish described in 1951
Taxonomy articles created by Polbot
Endemic fauna of the Democratic Republic of the Congo